Mumm Peak is located on the border of Alberta and British Columbia. The peak lies on the common boundary shared by Jasper National Park and Mount Robson Provincial Park. It was named in 1910 by J. Norman Collie after Arnold L. Mumm (1859–1927), an English publisher and mountaineer who made the first ascent of this peak with Collie. The mountain is composed of sedimentary rock laid down during the Precambrian to Jurassic periods and pushed east and over the top of younger rock during the Laramide orogeny.

Climate

Based on the Köppen climate classification, Mumm Peak is located in a subarctic climate zone with cold, snowy winters, and mild summers. Winter temperatures can drop below −20 °C with wind chill factors below −30 °C.

See also
 List of peaks on the Alberta–British Columbia border
 Mountains of Alberta
 Mountains of British Columbia

References

External links
 Arnold Mumm

Mumm Peak
Mumm Peak
Canadian Rockies